Marie Jubran (1907/1911 - 1956) was a Lebanese soprano singer. She was known for her talents of improvisation and interpretation of classical forms of singing, Dawr and Muwashshah.

Life
Marie Jubran (ماري جبران) was born in 1911 in Beirut (or in 1907 according to other sources). As a young child she moved with her family from Beirut to Damascus to flee the events that were taking place in Lebanon during the First World War. At the death of her father Yussef Jubran, Jubran when to live with her aunt, the actress Marie Jubran, with whom she lived with in Jerusalem. At age 10, Marie began to learn dance, theater, singing and the lute. She then became the singer in the troupe of an Egyptian actor, Husayn al-Barbari.

She went on to perform in Jaffa, Haifa, east of the West Bank and Cairo. In Jerusalem, her artistic reputation grew and she became Marie "La petite" to differentiate her from her aunt. She returned to Damascus between 1924 and 1925 after nine years of absence. She then left Damascus for Beirut due to the uprising of the Syrian population for independence.

In 1927 she returned to Syria where she performed successively in Damascus, Aleppo and again in Damascus. In the early 1930s, Jubran's artistic reputation spread to Cairo, where she performed for seven years. In the late 1930s, she returned to Damascus where she performed at the Al-Abbassiyat Café. In 1950 she was elected president of the Syrian Musicians' Union.

During her career, Marie Jubran sang with the most famous Egyptian composers such as Sayed Darwish, Dawd Husni, Zakarya Ahmad, Abu Al-'ala Muhammad, Muhammad al-Qasabaji, Mohammed Abdel Wahab, and Syrian composers such as Zaki Muhammad, Najib al-Sarrâj, Muhammad Muhsen, Riyad al-Bundak, and Rashid Azzou.

There are very few records of Marie Jubran's work. An anthology was published in the year 2000 by the Syrian Ministry of Culture in No. 16 of the "Collection of Masters of Music and Syrian Song." She died in Damascus in 1956 of cancer.

References

20th-century births
1956 deaths
20th-century Lebanese women singers
Syrian people of Lebanese descent